Charlotte Lorgeré (born 25 August 1994) is a French footballer who plays as a defender for Division 2 Féminine club Nantes. She has been a member of the France national team.

References

External links
 
 
 

1994 births
Living people
Sportspeople from Côtes-d'Armor
French women's footballers
Women's association football defenders
Division 1 Féminine players
En Avant Guingamp (women) players
Toulouse FC (women) players
AS Saint-Étienne (women) players
FC Metz (women) players
France women's international footballers
FC Nantes (women) players
Footballers from Brittany